Cream nut is a common name for several trees from the tropical Americas which produce edible nuts, and may refer to:

Bertholletia excelsa
Lecythis, especially:
Lecythis pisonis